The A562 is a road in England which runs from Liverpool to Warrington.

Route

Parliament Street
At Liverpool, the road is known at first as Parliament Street.

Upper Parliament Street to Speke Boulevard
It then becomes Upper Parliament Street, Smithdown Road, Allerton Road, Menlove Avenue, Hillfoot Road, Hillfoot Avenue and Higher Road, before joining Speke Boulevard.

Penketh
It ends in Penketh, Warrington.

External links
 
 

Roads in England
Roads in Cheshire
Transport in Liverpool
Roads in Merseyside